"Don't!" is a song co-written and recorded by Canadian country music singer Shania Twain.  It was released in January 2005 as the second single from her Greatest Hits compilation album. The song was written by Twain and then-husband Robert John "Mutt" Lange. The song was also included under the end credits of the 2005 film An Unfinished Life, and in the Brazilian soap opera América.

Music video

The music video for "Don't!" was shot in Oaxaca, Mexico at Quinta Real Hotel and Yucca plantation. It was filmed on October 24, 2004 and released January 2, 2005, it was directed by Wayne Isham. The video is available on some of the commercial singles for "Don't!". In 2006, CMT Canada named "Don't!" the eighth sexiest country music video.

In the video Twain rides a horse through rows of Yucca wearing a red dress, and walks around in the hotel wearing a white dress and corset. Near the end of the video, a tear runs down her face.

Chart performance 
"Don't!" debuted on the Billboard Hot Country Singles & Tracks chart the week of January 29, 2005 at number 44, Twain's fourth highest debut of all time, and highest of the week. The single spent 15 weeks on the chart and climbed to a peak position of number 24 on April 2, 2005, where it remained for one week.

Released to adult contemporary radio on March 28, 2005, "Don't!" debuted at number 29, the highest debut of the week, on April 16, 2005. The single spent 16 weeks on the chart and climbed to a peak position of number 18 on May 14, 2005, where it remained for four non-consecutive weeks. "Don't!" became Twain's tenth consecutive top 20 single there.

In the UK, "Don't!" appeared at its peak position of number 30 on March 12, 2005. This became, and remains, her lowest peaking single in that country, and only remained on the chart for two weeks. It fell to number 57 in its second week, then fell off the chart completely. To date, it is her last single to chart in the UK.

Track listings
These are the formats for major releases.

Maxi CD single (UK & Germany)
"Don't" - 3:53
"I'm Gonna Getcha Good!" (Live) - 4:23
"From This Moment On" (Live) - 4:07
Enhanced: "Don't" - Music Video

UK CD single - Limited Edition
"Don't" - 3:55
"Party For Two" (Kenny Hayes Remix) - 5:43

Germany CD single
"Don't" - 3:55
"I'm Gonna Getcha Good! (Live) - 4:23

Official versions
Album Version (3:56)
Radio Edit (3:30)

Cover version
Paula Fernandes covered the song on her Dust in the Wind album, released in 2007.

Charts

Release history

References

2005 singles
2004 songs
Shania Twain songs
Music videos directed by Wayne Isham
Songs written by Robert John "Mutt" Lange
Song recordings produced by Robert John "Mutt" Lange
Songs written by Shania Twain
Pop ballads
Mercury Records singles
Mercury Nashville singles